Symantec Online Backup is an online remote backup service that provides businesses with a system for backing up and storing computer files over the Internet.  It was released in February, 2008 on the Symantec Protection Network platform.

Symantec Online Backup is an example of cloud computing or SaaS (software as a service).

Sales for Symantec Online Backup were discontinued as of January 2010.

See also

 Symantec Backup Exec - on-premises backup and recovery software for small to medium enterprises

References

External links
 Symantec Online Backup details

Backup software